Tova Ascher, also Tova Asher is an Israeli film director and film editor. She edited over 50 films.

Personal life and career 
Ascher was born in Netanya. After graduating from the Netanya High School, she moved to Tel Aviv, where she received a bachelor's degree in philosophy and sociology from Tel Aviv University. Her first editorial work was for the Hebrew-language version of the film Diamonds.

The Jerusalem Post wrote that she is one of Israel’s most in-demand film editors.  British magazine Screen Daily describes her as "one of Israel's most respected film editors." 

Her sister, is also a film editor; in an interview, Tova Ascher said that her interest in film-making began when Lapid suggested her as an assistant editor in David Perlov's 1972 film The Pill. She has two other siblings, a sister and a brother. 

She is married to Yoni Ascher, a historian at the University of Haifa and they have two children, also involved in the film industry:  a daughter (part-time screenwriter) and a son (film director and editor).

Selected filmography
Films that earned awards for Tova Asher are marked with stars.
2015*: A.K.A Nadia (director and screenwriter)
2010: The Human Resources Manager (editor)
2008: Lemon Tree (film) (editor)
2008: Spring 1941 (editor)
2006: Three Mothers (2006 film) (editor)
2004: The Syrian Bride (editor)
2003: No Longer 17 (editor)
2000*: ההסדר ("The Arrangement"), English title: Time of Favor (editor)
1998: Circus Palestine (editor)
1989: One of Us (editor)
1988*:  (editor)
1986: Bar 51 (editor)
1986: The Lover (editor)
1984: Beyond the Walls (editor)
1983: A Married Couple (editor)
1982: Noa at 17 (editor)
1981:  (editor)

Awards and nominations
1988: Fictitious Marriage, Silver Lamp Award for editing
2000: Time of Favor, Ophir Award  for best editing
2006: Three Mothers nominated for Ophir Award  for best editing
2008: Lemon Tree nominated Ophir Award  for best editing
2015: A.K.A Nadia:
2015 Israel Critics’ Forum Award for best feature film at the Jerusalem Film Festival. Jury motivation: "...for a profound and articulate discussion of issues of identity and belonging to a place and a family. The director offers an intricate portrait of a reality that is grounded in separation walls, checkpoints and segregation. The film examines whether one can create oneself anew within a tragic political context, by presenting a fascinating, complex and touching human story."
2017 Micki Moore Award (to the Best Narrative Feature Film directed by a woman) at the Toronto Jewish Film Festival

Notes

References

External links

Year of birth missing (living people)
Living people
Israeli film directors
Israeli film editors